Marius Vizer (born 7 November 1958) is a Romanian former judoka and judo coach, and businessman. Since 2007, he has been the president of the International Judo Federation. Vizer also holds an Austrian passport.

Judo
Between 1995 and 2001, he was President of the Romanian Judo Federation. Between 2000 and 2007, Vizer was President of the European Judo Union. And between 2013 and 2015, he was President of the SportAccord.

Since 2007, he has been the president of the International Judo Federation.

After the 2022 Russian invasion of Ukraine, all 31 of the other international Olympic sports organizations banned Russian athletes.  Vizer, a long-time close friend of Russian President Vladimir Putin, wanted instead to let Russians and Belarusians continue to compete as neutral athletes. Finally, both national federations withdrew of their own accord, until June 2022 when they again competed. Ukraine boycotted IJF events beginning in June 2022 because the Russian team was allowed to compete in and entered competitions. Judo is one of the few Olympic sports which goes against the recommendation  of the International Olympic Committee.

Business
He settled in Austria as a judo coach. In the 1990s, Vizer started importing vegetables and fruits from Romania to Austria, especially apples, while he exported banana and orange wagons to Romania. He then organized Telebingo in Romania, in collaboration with TVR, until the National Lottery closed it.

He was the owner of the football clubs FC Bihor, Olimpia Salonta and FC Sopron.

Personal life
In 2015, Vizer married former Romanian singer Irina Nicolae after years of dating. They live in Budapest. On 2 February 2018, his wife gave birth to the couple's child, Scarlett-Maria.

He holds a 7th dan black belt in judo. He has a long friendship with Russian President Vladimir Putin for more than 25 years.

References

External links

 
 

 

 

1958 births
Living people
People from Bihor County
Romanian male judoka
Judoka trainers
Romanian sports executives and administrators
Romanian expatriates in Hungary
Austrian expatriates in Hungary
Naturalised citizens of Austria
Austrian people of Romanian descent